The Telus Cup – Offensive is awarded annually to the person voted the best offensive player in the Quebec Major Junior Hockey League. It was known as the Shell Cup from 1989–90 to 1993–94, and as the Ford Cup from 1994–95 to 1996–97.

Winners

External links
 QMJHL official site List of trophy winners.

Quebec Major Junior Hockey League trophies and awards